Ali Nazarmohammadi born, 1981 is a retired Iranian footballer and coach who recently managed Khooneh be Khooneh.

Career
He started his football career in the youth team of Esteghlal Rasht and then moved to Malavan because of army services. After playing a couple of seasons for Malavan he moved to Mes Kerman and helped the team to be promoted to the Iran Pro League. In 2006, he came back to his hometown Rasht and played for Pegah Gilan. In the beginning of the 2008–09 season Pegah was sold to Damash Iranian and named Damash Gilan. He had an unsuccessful season with Damash and the team was relegated to the Azadegan League. After Damash's relegation he moved to the newly founded team Steel Azin along with players Mohammadreza Mahdavi and Afshin Chavoshi.

Statistics

Club career statistics

Managerial statistics

Honours

Player
Pegah Gilan
Hazfi Cup Runner-up: 2007–08

Mes Kerman
Azadegan League: 2005–061

Damash Gilan
Azadegan League: 2010–11

Managerial
Sepidrood
Azadegan League runner-up: 2016–17 (promotion)

References
Iran Pro League Stats
Ali Nazarmohammadi at Navad

1982 births
Living people
People from Tehran
Association football goalkeepers
Iranian footballers
Malavan players
Pegah Gilan players
Damash Gilan players
Sanat Mes Kerman F.C. players
Steel Azin F.C. players
People from Rasht
Sportspeople from Gilan province